Catherine Burks-Brooks (born October 8, 1939) is an American civil rights movement activist, teacher, social worker, jewelry retailer, and newspaper editor.

Personal life 
Burks was born on October 8, 1939, near Selma, Alabama, she was however raised in Birmingham, Alabama.

Burks was a student at Tennessee State University. Burks was active in the Mississippi movement and was the co-editor of Mississippi Free Press from 1962 to 1963. Burks taught as an elementary school teacher in 1964. In 1965–1966 she worked as a social worker in Detroit, she later became a jeweler specializing in African jewelry and clothing.

Burks lived in the Bahamas in the 1970s before relocating back to Birmingham, Alabama in 1979.

Burks became a district sales manager for Avon cosmetics in 1982, until 1998. Burks now works as a substitute teacher in Birmingham.

Burks currently resides in a suburb outside of Birmingham, Alabama.  She volunteers her time by speaking to groups about her involvement in the Freedom Rides.

Involvement in the Civil Rights Movement 

Burks participated in multiple Freedom Rides including a Freedom Ride from Nashville, Tennessee to Montgomery, Alabama from May 17–21, 1961.

She heard about the Freedom Rides from a man named John Lewis. She began to participate in demonstrations he led. In an interview, she states "We had been demonstrating, we had been to jail several times as a matter of fact. I've also been in jail here in Birmingham before the Freedom Ride".

On the second day of the freedom ride, May 18, Burks recalls bantering with a segregationist and Birmingham Public Safety Commissioner, Bull Connor as he drove Nashville freedom riders back to the Tennessee state line from jail.

Two days later Burks was caught in the middle of a riot at the Montgomery Greyhound Bus Station. In the film Freedom Riders, Burks clearly recalled an assault on fellow Freedom Rider, Jim Zwerg.

She later witnessed a siege of the First Baptist Church by angry segregationists on the following day.

Later in August 1961, she married Freedom Rider Paul Brooks. They later participated in the Mississippi voter registration movement, and co-edited the Mississippi Free Press in 1962–1963.

References 

Living people
1939 births
African-American activists
Activists for African-American civil rights
Freedom Riders
Activists from Birmingham, Alabama
Activists from Selma, Alabama
Tennessee State University alumni
21st-century African-American people